This is a list of members of the Victorian Legislative Assembly as elected at the 29 December 1908 election and subsequent by-elections up to the election of 16 November 1911.

Note the "Term in Office" refers to that members term(s) in the Assembly, not necessarily for that electorate.

 Anstey resigned in February 1910; replaced by James Jewell in March 1910.
 Bent died 17 September 1909; replaced by Oswald Snowball in October 1909.
 Harris died 5 July 1910; replaced by Samuel Barnes in July 1910.

References

 Re-member (a database of all Victorian MPs since 1851). Parliament of Victoria.

Members of the Parliament of Victoria by term
20th-century Australian politicians